Mazidi (also Romanized as Mazīdī) is a village in Shiveh Sar Rural District, Bayangan District, Paveh County, Kermanshah Province, Iran. At the 2006 census, its population was 180, in 45 families.

References 

Populated places in Paveh County